Ningxiang No. 13 High School, commonly abbreviated as Ningxiang Shisanzhong, is a public high school in downtown Ningxiang, Hunan, China. The school is one of the model high schools in Ningxiang and has a great reputation for its excellent education quality, especially in literature and art.

History

The Ningxiang No. 13 High School traces its roots back to the former Keda Primary School of the Ou Family, founded by He Xuntao in 1949. In 1954, the school moved to Sanyangtang, Bitang Brigade, Heshiqiao Commune (贺石桥公社碧塘大队三阳塘). It was renamed as Meitanba Primary School after that and opened its doors in July 1955 to eight classes of more than 300 students.

After the closure of Meitanba Primary School in 1958, it became a middle school with the addition of the 7th, 8th and 9th grades. In July 1976, Heshiqiao Middle School was merged into Ningxiang No. 13 High School. The school was renamed as Ningxiang No. 13 High School in 1977. In August 1978, the school was separated from Heshiqiao Middle School.

In March 2007, it was listed among the "Model High Schools in Hunan".

Education Features
 Singing. In June 2016, Xia Yu won the championship in the National Campus Auditions in Sichuan of The Voice of China.

Principals
Ningxiang No. 13 High School's Heads of School have been Peng Shaokang (1955-1958), Chen Juxun (1958-1963), Tan Jihui (1963-1970), Li Kaiyin (1970-1976), Jiang Zhirong (1976-1984), Ding Shenqian (1984-1988), Peng Jianming (1988-1993), Yi Guangrong (1993-1995), Yan Qiuliang (1995-1998), Xiao Mingzhong (1998-2001), Zhou Zhiwen (2001-2002), Lai Weixin (2002-2004), Yu Gujin (2004-2015),  and Qiu Tianmin (2015–present).

Notable alumni
 Cai Cheng, writer.
 Chen Huaming, professor at Sichuan University.
 He Xiaoping, writer.
 Xia Shi, calligrapher.
 Xia Tingfang, professor at Hunan University.
 Xie Youping, professor at Fudan University.
 Yang Ziyun, officer in the PLA Air Force.
 Zhou Siyang, officer in the National Energy Administration.

References

Educational institutions established in 1954
High schools in Changsha
1954 establishments in China